The Lotus E22 is a Formula One racing car designed by Lotus to compete in the 2014 Formula One season. The chassis was designed by Nick Chester, Chris Cooney, Martin Tolliday and Nicolas Hennel with Renault supplying the team's powertrain. It was driven by Romain Grosjean and Pastor Maldonado, who replaced Kimi Räikkönen after Räikkönen left the team to rejoin Ferrari. The E22 was designed to use Renault's new 1.6-litre V6 turbocharged engine, the Energy F1-2014. This was the last car of the Enstone-based team which used Renault engines until Renault RS16, before a new one-year deal with fellow Daimler brand Mercedes.

The team was forced to miss the first pre-season test at Jerez de la Frontera, but released computer-rendered images of the car in the week beforehand, showing a distinctive asymmetrical forked nose design.

Lotus nevertheless struggled to earn points throughout the season, with only two more point-scoring finishes at Monaco for Grosjean and in the United States for Maldonado. The team would admit that a fundamental design flaw on the chassis was hugely responsible for the poor performance during the season. Thus, the team stopped development of the car relatively early to concentrate on the E23 chassis after developments on the troublesome car brought no improvements to its performance.

Complete Formula One results
(key)

† — Driver failed to finish the race, but was classified as they had completed greater than 90% of the race distance.

References

E22
2014 Formula One season cars